Phthorimaea urosema is a moth in the family Gelechiidae. It was originally described from one adult male specimen from Peru.

The wingspan is about 14 mm. The forewings are greyish-ochreous, somewhat sprinkled irregularly with dark grey, the costa suffused with dark grey irroration and with three or four cloudy blackish-grey dots towards the base on the dorsal half. There is an oblique transverse patch of ochreous-whitish suffusion from the costa towards the base, followed on the costa by a small blackish spot and in the disc by an elongate blotch of blackish suffusion. The stigmata are blackish, surrounded by irregular ochreous-whitish suffusion, the plical obliquely before the first discal, a blotch of blackish suffusion in the middle of the disc lying between and beneath the discal stigmata. There are three small ochreous-whitish spots on the costa towards the apex, interrupting the dark grey irroration. The hindwings are slaty-grey.

References

 Povolný, D. 1990: Gnorimoschemini of Peru and Bolivia (Lepidoptera, Gelechiidae). Steenstrupia, 16: 153–223. [Not seen]

Phthorimaea
Moths described in 1917